Ceanothus griseus is a species of flowering shrub known by the common names Carmel ceanothus and Carmel creeper. 'Carmel' refers to the Carmel-by-the-Sea region in California.

Description
The Ceanothus griseus shrub may exceed two meters-6 feet in height when mostly erect, or it can grow wider than tall. The evergreen leaves are ribbed and have slightly serrated edges and fuzzy undersides. The inflorescences are borne on thick stalks a few centimeters long and are dense with small blue or purple flowers. The fruit is a  sticky black capsule about 4 millimeters in length containing usually 3 seeds. This is a plant of the chaparral and coastal scrub plant communities.

Distribution
This Ceanothus is endemic to California, where its distribution extends throughout the Coast Ranges in the northern two thirds of the state.

Cultivation
The species and cultivars are widely available in the horticulture trade for conventional and native plant habitat gardens.

References

External links
Jepson Manual Treatment
USDA Plants Profile
Photo gallery

griseus
Endemic flora of California
Natural history of the California chaparral and woodlands
Natural history of the California Coast Ranges
Natural history of Monterey County, California
Plants described in 1897
Garden plants of North America
Drought-tolerant plants